Charles Stuart Aubrey Abbott, 3rd Baron Tenterden KCB (26 December 1834 – 22 September 1882), was a British diplomat.

Biography
Abbott was born in London, the son of Charles Abbott (1803–1838), younger son of Charles Abbott, 1st Baron Tenterden. The title passed to the younger Charles on the death of his uncle John Henry Abbott, 2nd Baron Tenterden (1796–1870). He was educated at Eton College (1848–53), and entered into service at the Foreign Office in 1854 by the patronage of the foreign secretary, Lord Clarendon.

In the 1860s and '70s Abbott was involved in the negotiations of the famous Alabama Claims. His sense of moderation came to good use in the successful arbitration of the dispute. In 1873 Tenterden was promoted to the post of permanent under-secretary, and in 1878 he was created KCB.

He was married twice; his first wife was his cousin Penelope Smyth, with whom he had four children - Audrey Mary Florence born 1861, Geraldine Alice Ellen born 1863, Charles Stuart Henry born 1865, and Gwen Elca Violet born 1868. Penelope died in 1879. The year after Tenterden married the widow Emma Rowcliffe (née Bailey, d. 1928). He died in Lynmouth in 1882.

Arms

References

Jones, R. A., "Abbott, Charles Stuart Aubrey", Oxford Dictionary of National Biography, (Oxford, 2004)

External links

1834 births
1882 deaths
Members of HM Foreign Service
Diplomatic peers
Knights Commander of the Order of the Bath
People educated at Eton College
Barons in the Peerage of the United Kingdom
Permanent Under-Secretaries of State for Foreign Affairs
British civil servants